Mary Hughes is a former international lawn bowls competitor for Wales.

In 1988 she won the bronze medal in the fours at the 1988 World Outdoor Bowls Championship in Auckland with Margaret Pomeroy, Pam Griffiths and Linda Parker.

Two years later she represented Wales at the 1990 Commonwealth Games.

References

Date of birth missing (living people)
Welsh female bowls players
Bowls players at the 1990 Commonwealth Games
Living people
Year of birth missing (living people)
Commonwealth Games competitors for Wales